Hylander is a Swedish surname. Notable people with the surname include:

Anders Hylander (1883–1967), Swedish gymnast
Dan Hylander (born 1954), Swedish songwriter, singer, and guitarist
Nils Hylander (1904–1970), Swedish botanist and mycologist
Sigfrid Hylander (1902–1978), Swedish Olympic weightlifter

Swedish-language surnames